BDC Televizija or BDC TV is a Bosnian commercial cable television channel, established 2009, based in Brčko District, Bosnia and Herzegovina.The program is mainly produced in the Bosnian language.

References

External links 
 Official website
 BDC TV on Facebook
 BDCTV on Twitter
 BDCTV on YouTube
 Communications Regulatory Agency of Bosnia and Herzegovina

Mass media in Brčko District
Television stations in Bosnia and Herzegovina
Television channels and stations established in 2009